Kolby LaCrone (born September 12, 1986 in Zanesville, Ohio) is an American former soccer player.

Career

Youth and amateur
LaCrone attended Tri-Valley High School in Dresden, Ohio, where he was the first player in state history to record over 100 goals and 100 assist in the same career (108g/109a), and played club soccer for Muskingum County United in Zanesville and for Ohio F.C. Xtreme in Columbus, Ohio. He played college soccer at West Virginia University and Marshall University. At Marshall University he ended his college career with 13 goals and 3 assist.

During his college years LaCrone also played two seasons with the West Virginia Chaos in the USL Premier Development League.

Professional
LaCrone joined the USL First Division franchise Cleveland City Stars on April 4, 2009. He made his professional debut on April 18, 2009, in Cleveland's 2009 season-opening game against Miami FC. The City Stars picked up his option for a second year, but unfortunately the team folded soon after. He was part of the final roster for the Cleveland City Stars.

After joining the Pittsburgh Riverhounds, a USL 2 division team, for the a brief stint in the 2010 season, the Professional Arena Soccer League's Louisville Lightning signed him to play in the 2010–11 season. He was considered a rising star of the league before he decided to take his game back outdoors.

After playing one season of indoor soccer LaCrone returned to the outdoor game by signing with Dayton Dutch Lions of the USL Pro league on February 28, 2011. It was the leagues first year in existence after the termination of the USL 1 and USL 2. He scored the first goal for the professional Lions in their season-opening game against the Charleston Battery.

References

External links
 Dayton Dutch Lions profile
 Cleveland City Stars bio
 Marshall bio
 Louisville Lightning bio

1986 births
Living people
American soccer players
Cleveland City Stars players
Dayton Dutch Lions players
Pittsburgh Riverhounds SC players
USL League Two players
USL First Division players
USL Second Division players
USL Championship players
West Virginia Chaos players
West Virginia Mountaineers men's soccer players
Soccer players from Ohio
Sportspeople from Zanesville, Ohio
Marshall Thundering Herd men's soccer players
Association football forwards